The Man from M.A.R.S. may mean:
 The Man from M.A.R.S. (1922 film), a silent science fiction film
 "The Man from M.A.R.S." (cartoon), a Taz-Mania cartoon
 The Man from Mars, a 1946 Polish film

See also
 Martian